Robin Brown  may refer to:

Robin Brown (cricketer) (born 1951), Zimbabwean cricketer
Robin Brown (journalist), Canadian journalist and radio presenter
Robin Brown (politician) (born 1961), American politician
Robin Brown (consumer advocate), Australian consumer advocate
Robin S. Brown, American psychoanalyst and academic
A fictional character in the children's novel Merry Go Round in Oz